Catastia kistrandella is a species of snout moth in the genus Catastia. It was described by Opheim in 1963. It is found in Fennoscandia and northern Russia.

The wingspan is 18–22 mm.

References

Moths described in 1963
Phycitini
Moths of Europe